The Layton family is a Canadian political family. It includes Jack Layton who served as the leader of the New Democratic Party, Olivia Chow a city councillor for Metropolitan Toronto and the City of Toronto, Jack's son (and Olivia's step-son), Toronto City Councillor Mike Layton.

Notable members 

 William Steeves (May 20, 1814 – December 9, 1873) was a merchant, lumberman, politician and Father of Canadian Confederation.

 Gilbert Layton (November 5, 1899 – May 29, 1961) was a politician and businessman in Quebec, Canada. Gilbert was the father of Robert, the grandfather of Jack, and great-grandfather of Mike.
 Robert Layton (politician)  (December 25, 1925 – May 9, 2002) served as the minister of State from 1984 to 1986. He was Gilbert's son.

 Jack Layton  (July 18, 1950 – August 22, 2011) was an academic and politician who served as the leader of the New Democratic Party (NDP) from 2003 to 2011 and leader of the Official Opposition in 2011. He previously sat on Toronto City Council, occasionally holding the title of acting mayor or deputy mayor of Toronto during his tenure as city councillor. Layton was the member of Parliament for Toronto—Danforth from 2004 until his death.

 Olivia Chow (born March 24, 1957) is a retired politician who was a federal New Democratic Party, and a member of Parliament representing Trinity—Spadina from 2006 to 2014. She ran in the 2014 Toronto mayoral election, placing third behind winner John Tory and runner-up Doug Ford, and served on the Metropolitan Toronto Council from 1991 to the 1998 amalgamation and subsequently on Toronto City Council until 2005, when she ran for MP. She is the widow Jack, whom she married in 1988.
 Mike Layton (born November 26, 1980) served on Toronto City Council from 2010 until 2022. Layton most recently represented Ward 11 University—Rosedale. He was first elected in the 2010 municipal election in Ward 19 Trinity—Spadina. Layton did not run for re-election in 2022. He is the son of Jack and step-son of Olivia.

Offices held 

 Minister of state (Canada)
 1984 to 1986
 New Democratic Party leader
 2003 to 2011
 Leader of the Official Opposition
 2011
 Member of Parliament
 2004 - 2011
 Acting Mayor of Toronto
 Occasionally 
 Toronto City Councillor
 1982 to 1985 (Jack)
 1988 to 1991 (Jack)
 1998 to 2005 (Olivia)
 2010 to 2022 (Mike)
 Metropolitan Toronto Councillor
 1991 to 1998 (Olivia)
 1985 to 1988 (Jack)
 1994 to 2004 (Jack)
 Toronto District School Board trustee
 1985 to 1991

See also 
 List of Layton family members
 Trudeau family
 Ford family (Canada)

References 

Layton family
Canadian families
Political families of Canada
Politicians from Toronto